Circle Studio was a video game developer located in Derby, United Kingdom.

The company was formed and staffed in October 2003 by a group of former employees at Core Design, a studio owned by Eidos Interactive. The founders of the new company, brothers Jeremy Heath-Smith and Adrian Smith, had a managerial role in the Tomb Raider series, which was Core Design's best known creation.

In 2005, Circle Studio finished working on a title called Without Warning, a third-person shooter for the PlayStation 2 and Xbox. It was published by Capcom. The game was generally poorly received, and after releasing it, Circle Studio transitioned to developing and publishing licensed DVD games, with distribution handled by Pinnacle Vision.

Despite having secured a 7 figure investment from the Royal Bank of Scotland in May 2006 the company was liquidated in February 2007.

Games

Video Games
 Without Warning (2005)

DVD Games
 2006 FIFA World Cup Trivia Challenge
 Blockbusters
 British Hit Singles and Albums
 Discovery Kids: Killers of the Wild
 Discovery Kids: Myths and Monsters
 Eurosport Total Sports Quiz
 NBA Challenge
 Madagascar: Animal Trivia DVD Game
 Now That's What I Call A Music Quiz
 The Price is Right
 Shrek: Totally Tangled Tales

References

External links

Video game development companies
Video game companies established in 2003
Video game companies disestablished in 2007
Defunct video game companies of the United Kingdom